Mezzaluna Cup is the name for two types of figure skating competitions held in Mentana (Rome), Italy. The first one is an international interclub competition for novice level skaters, inaugurated on 7–9 April 2017. The second one is an International Skating Union event for senior, junior, and novice-level ice dancers, inaugurated on 4-6 October 2019.

Mezzaluna Cup (international interclub competition)

Mezzaluna Cup - Ice Dance

Senior results

Junior results

References

External links
 2019 Mezzaluna Cup - Ice Dance at the International Skating Union
 2019 Mezzaluna Cup - Ice Dance at facebook

International figure skating competitions hosted by Italy